is a Japanese politician serving his first term in the House of Councillors representing the Miyagi at-large district. He was elected to the House in the July 2013 as a member of Your Party. Upon the party's dissolution in November 2014 he joined the Party for Future Generations. He was promoted to Secretary-General of the party in September 2015; the party changed its name to Party for Japanese Kokoro in December 2015. In November 2016 he left the party and joined the Liberal Democratic Party's parliamentary group, but did not officially join the LDP.
He joined the LDP on September 24, 2017, and was elected as a candidate from the proportional district in the 25th ordinary election for the House of Councillors held in July 2019.

Wada graduated with a degree in political science from Keio University's Faculty of Law in 1997. Prior to entering politics he worked as an announcer for national broadcaster NHK from 1997 until 2013.

References

1974 births
Living people
Politicians from Tokyo
People from Koganei, Tokyo
Keio University alumni
Members of the House of Councillors (Japan)
Your Party politicians
Party for Japanese Kokoro politicians
21st-century Japanese politicians